Generali Italia S.p.A. or simply Generali is an Italian insurance company based in Mogliano Veneto, which is a subsidiary of Generali Group. 
Alleanza Assicurazioni, DAS, Genagricola, Genertel and Genertellife, Generali Welion and Generali Jeniot are headed by Generali Italia.

History
The company was founded on July 1, 2013 when the Italian branch of Assicurazioni Generali was transferred to INA Assitalia and the name was changed to Generali Italia SpA. The insurance activities of the Toro Group (Toro, Lloyd Italico and Augusta) were then integrated. Sergio Balbinot was the first chairmen and Raffaele Agrusti the CEO; their office lasted until the approval of the 2013 financial statements. On 7 October 2013 Philippe Donnet joined the Generali Group and became Country Manager Italy and CEO of Generali Italia. 

In May 2016 Marco Sesana was appointed Chief Executive Officer and General Manager.
In the following three years a new phase started and two new companies were born: Generali Welion, an integrated welfare company, and Generali Jeniot, which deals with IoT services and connected insurance.
In May 2020, IVASS, the supervisory entity for the sector, ordered Cattolica's top management to carry out a capital increase of 500 million by 30 October 2020. 
On 25 June 2020, Generali and Cattolica announce a strategic partnership which consists in the entry of Generali into Cattolica with a stake of 24.4%

In November 2021, Generali held 84.475% of Cattolica's share capital.

In September 2022 Giancarlo Fancel, previously group Chief Risk Officer, was appointed Country Manager Italy and Chief Executive Officer.

Activities 
Generali Italia, including its subsidiaries, has:
 10 million customers 
 € 24.6BN total premiums in 2021 
 € 120bn of assets under management in 2021 
 13 thousand employees 
 40,000 distributors plus bancassurance.

Subsidiaries
Insurance companies
 Alleanza Assicurazioni
 Genertel
 Genertellife
 DAS
 Cattolica Assicurazioni
Service companies
 Generali Welion
 Generali Jeniot
 Genagricola

See also
 INA Assitalia

References

External links
  

Insurance companies of Italy
Companies based in Veneto
Province of Treviso
Generali Group